In mathematics, an Orlicz sequence space is any of certain class of linear spaces of scalar-valued sequences, endowed with a special norm, specified below, under which it forms a Banach space.  Orlicz sequence spaces generalize the  spaces, and as such play an important role in functional analysis.

Definition

Fix  so that  denotes either the real or complex scalar field.

In what follows, unless otherwise stated we'll assume all Orlicz functions are nondegenerate. This implies  for all .

For each scalar sequence  set

Two other definitions will be important in the ensuing discussion. An Orlicz function  is said to satisfy the Δ2 condition at zero whenever

We denote by  the subspace of scalar sequences  such that  for all .

Properties

Theorem 1.  If  is an Orlicz function then the following conditions are equivalent:

Two Orlicz functions  and  satisfying the Δ2 condition at zero are called equivalent whenever there exist are positive constants  such that  for all .

 can be isomorphic to  without their unit vector bases being equivalent. (See the example below of an Orlicz sequence space with two nonequivalent symmetric bases.)

Theorem 2. Let  be an Orlicz function.  Then  is reflexive if and only if

Theorem 3 (K. J. Lindberg). Let  be an infinite-dimensional closed subspace of a separable Orlicz sequence space . Then  has a subspace  isomorphic to some Orlicz sequence space  for some Orlicz function  satisfying the Δ2 condition at zero.

Theorem 4 (Lindenstrauss/Tzafriri).

Corollary.

Note that in the above Theorem 4, the copy of  may not always be chosen to be complemented, as the following example shows.

Example (Lindenstrauss/Tzafriri). This same space  contains at least two nonequivalent symmetric bases.

Theorem 5 (K. J. Lindberg & Lindenstrauss/Tzafriri).  If  is an Orlicz sequence space satisfying  (i.e., the two-sided limit exists) then the following are all true.

Example.

References

Functional analysis
Sequence spaces